Jack Henry (21 January 1921 – 3 April 2004) was an Australian rules footballer who played with Essendon in the Victorian Football League (VFL). He won two reserves best and fairests, in 1943 and 1944; in the latter season he was also runner-up to Footscray's Dick Wearmouth in the league reserves best and fairest. Henry later played for Williamstown and Ascot Vale before moving to Queensland where he was captain-coach of Morningside.

Notes

External links 		
		

Essendon Football Club past player profile
	
		
1921 births
2004 deaths
Australian rules footballers from Victoria (Australia)
Essendon Football Club players
Morningside Australian Football Club players
Williamstown Football Club players